HD 53501 (HR 2662; Gliese 3422), is a solitary star in the southern circumpolar constellation Volans. It has an apparent magnitude of 5.18, allowing it to be seen with the naked eye under ideal conditions.

HD 53501 has a stellar classification of K3 III, indicating that it is a red giant. It radiates at 126 times the luminosity of the Sun from its photosphere at an effective temperature of 4,169 K, giving it an orange glow.

This star is considered to be a probable member of the 61 Cygni moving group, a group of high velocity stars that share a common motion with 61 Cygni.

References 

Volans (constellation)
K-type giants
CD-67 492
053501
2662
033682
3422
Volantis, 6